Tweneboah Kodua, also known as Abusuapanin Judas or Judas, is a Ghanaian actor and comedian who has featured in many films. He was the best friend of the late Bob Santo.

Career 
He was the founder of the Ominitimininim Concert Party group with Bob Santo as the leader.

Filmography 

 Concert Party
 Double Sense
 419 I and II
 Banker to Banker
 Marijata
 Asem
 That Day (Ghana Movie)
 Efiewura
 Onyame Tumi So
 Okukuseku
 Sika
 Hard Times

References 

Living people
Ghanaian male film actors
Ghanaian comedians
1945 births